Belemnia dubia is a moth of the subfamily Arctiinae. It was described by William Forsell Kirby in 1902. It is found in Brazil.

References

Arctiini
Moths described in 1902